Psilocybe gallaeciae is a species of psilocybin mushroom in the family Hymenogastraceae. It was found in Spain in 1997, and published as a new species in 2003.

See also
List of Psilocybe species

References

External links

gallaeciae
Fungi described in 2003
Fungi of Europe
Taxa named by Gastón Guzmán